Zakrzówek Nowy  is a village in the administrative district of Gmina Zakrzówek, within Kraśnik County, Lublin Voivodeship, in eastern Poland.

The village has a population of 130.

References

Villages in Kraśnik County